Aung Bala (1883 – 1913) was an influential Burmese dancer during the early British colonial era of Burma. He was especially famous for playing female lead roles. He is said to have been the only male artist in the Burmese dramatic arts industry who could perfectly perform as a female dancer.

Early life and career
Aung Bala, the youngest of four siblings, was born on 18 February 1883 in Hsinpyukyun, Magwe Region to U Lu Gyi, a puppeteer, and Me Pwint. His father died when he was six years old. He developed an interest in singing and dancing, and learned traditional dance from his uncle while he was a student, with his mother's permission.

Years later he became popular in the Hsinpyukyun area, performing at the local yein (choreographed group dance). He studied under Ma Htwe Lay in Mandalay and was the first to dance in the styles known as Toke Kyoe  and three-timing (စည်းသုံးကြိုး ဝါးသုံးကြိုး). He collaborated with Sein Gadone and Po Sein; the latter was his most popular dancing partner, and their performance in the jataka opera Kākavalliya (1909) became their signature piece.

Death and legacy

Aung Bala died on 22 November 1913 in Mandalay. The British government honored him with a cannon salute at his funeral. Many believed he was reborn as Bala Pyan, who was also a dancer.

The Aung Bala mont, a Burmese-style rice pancake topped with syrup, is named in honor of Aung Bala, as is a style of tin box.

Notes

See also
 Burmese dance
 Anyeint
 Sin Kho Ma Lay
 Yindaw Ma Lay
 Awba Thaung
 Liberty Ma Mya Yin
 Mya Chay Gyin Ma Ngwe Myaing

References

1883 births
1913 deaths
Burmese dancers
People from Magway Division